The 2021–22 Scottish Championship (known as the cinch Championship for sponsorship reasons) was the ninth season of the Scottish Championship, the second tier of Scottish football. The season began on 31 July.

Ten teams contested the league: Arbroath, Ayr United, Dunfermline Athletic, Greenock Morton, Hamilton Academical, Inverness Caledonian Thistle, Kilmarnock, Partick Thistle, Queen of the South and Raith Rovers.

Teams 
The following teams changed division after the 2020–21 season.

To Championship 
Promoted from League One

 Partick Thistle

Relegated from the Premiership

 Hamilton Academical
 Kilmarnock

From Championship 
Relegated to League One

 Alloa Athletic

Promoted to the Premiership

 Heart of Midlothian
 Dundee

Stadia and locations

Personnel and kits

Managerial changes

League summary

League table

Positions by round
The table lists the positions of teams after each week of matches. To preserve chronological evolvements, any postponed matches are not included in the round at which they were originally scheduled, but added to the full round they were played immediately afterwards. For example, if a match is scheduled for round 13, but then postponed and played between rounds 16 and 17, it is added to the standings for round 16.

Results 
Teams play each other four times, twice in the first half of the season (home and away) and twice in the second half of the season (home and away), making a total of 180 games, with each team playing 36.

First half of season (Matches 1–18)

Second half of season (Matches 19–36)

Season statistics

Scoring

Top scorers

Awards

Championship play-offs
The semi-finals will be contested by the teams placed second to fourth in Scottish League One, as well as the team placed ninth in the Scottish Championship. The winners will advance to the final, with the highest-ranked team hosting the second leg.

Bracket

Semi-finals

First leg

Second leg

Final

First leg

Second leg

References

External links
Official website

2
2
Scot
Scottish Championship seasons